Bagbati is a village located under the Ausgram II Community Development Block of Purba Bardhaman district, in the Indian state of West Bengal. It is located at a distance of 15 km from Guskhara and encompasses a total of 61.8 hectares. It is home to 272 households having a total populations of 1,052 individuals as of 2011.

References 

Villages in Purba Bardhaman district